Paramount Parks was the operator of Paramount's Kings Island, Paramount's Kings Dominion, Paramount's Great America, Paramount's Carowinds, and Paramount Canada's Wonderland, which annually attracted about 13 million patrons. National Amusements-owned Viacom assumed control of the company as part of its acquisition of Paramount Pictures in 1994. On June 30, 2006, Cedar Fair acquired the company, and the deal included a ten-year license to use the Paramount Parks name and theme, and a four-year license to use Nickelodeon names and themes.

Cedar Fair declined to exercise the Paramount licenses and they dropped Paramount and CBS-licensed names from the parks after the 2007 season, but opted to retain Nickelodeon names and themes until after the 2009 season when this license expired.

Holdings
The company once owned and operated Paramount's Kings Island, Paramount's Kings Dominion, Paramount's Great America, Paramount's Carowinds, and Paramount Canada's Wonderland and managed Bonfante Gardens in Gilroy, California. From late 2001 until late 2004, Paramount Parks also managed Terra Mítica, an amusement park in Benidorm, Valencia, Spain.

History
Paramount Communications, previously known as Gulf+Western, in turn had acquired the parks from Nelson Schwab and his management group. Schwab and his KECO Entertainment acquired the group in a management-led LBO from the Taft Broadcasting Company, which had built Kings Island in Cincinnati using rides that were moved from the Coney Island amusement park in Cincinnati, Ohio Taft had just closed.

The parks were part of Viacom's Blockbuster Entertainment division until 2002 when they were moved back to Paramount Pictures. After another Viacom corporate shuffle in 2004 the parks became part of Viacom Recreation, a division of Nickelodeon and MTV Networks.

On January 1, 2006, as Viacom went through a corporate split (creating a new version of Viacom and renaming the original company CBS Corporation), Paramount Parks was assigned to CBS Corporation. CBS Corporation, in order to "toss overboard" any unnecessary company assets, sought to sell the parks during the 2006 season, planning to continue their operation until a buyer was found. Cedar Fair, owners of more well known Cedar Point and Knott's Berry Farm theme parks approached the company in 2006. Within the acquisition, there was a license for 10 years of use of the Paramount prefix on the parks and Paramount properties at the former Paramount parks. Cedar Fair opted to remove most mentions of Paramount and Paramount intellectual properties by mid-2007. The only references to a Viacom property remaining were the characters and titles used in Nickelodeon Universe (Kings Island) and Nickelodeon Central (Kings Dominion, Carowinds, Great America, and Canada's Wonderland), all of which were rethemed to Peanuts for the 2010 season, to match the children's areas of Cedar Fair's other parks.

In June 2007, it was revealed that a Paramount Theme Park was to be developed and opened at the Dubailand complex (which itself is currently on hold) in the United Arab Emirates. No further developments were made, and the project was abandoned in 2016.

In October 2011, plans for a new Paramount theme park to be developed in Alhama, Murcia were revealed in Madrid. The resort to be called Paramount Park was to be the second-largest theme park in Europe after Disneyland, Paris. Projects to continue with the construction of the park have been scrapped.

In December 2018, it was announced that Paramount Pictures signed a deal with Mohegan Gaming & Entertainment to install the first Paramount-branded theme park in Incheon, South Korea. It is slated to open in 2025, three years after Inspire Integrated Entertainment Resort's opening. Paramount and Daewoo Motor Sales previously announced in 2008 that it will build Paramount Movie Park Korea in Songdo near Incheon, but the plans was never announced due to financial problems of Daewoo Motor Sales.

In December 2019, it was announced that Paramount Pictures with London Resort Company Holdings Paramount-theme in London United Kingdom The London Resort will open in 2024 and start construction in 2021.

Acquisitions 
The Paramount Parks were not built by Paramount, but rather were pre-existing and purchased as a whole, rebranded with the Paramount name. Effectively, it seems, Paramount was attempting to enter into the movie-based theme-park business popularized by amusement park and resort companies, such as Walt Disney Parks and Resorts, SeaWorld Parks & Entertainment, Six Flags Theme Parks, Cedar Fair, Warner Bros. Themed Entertainment and Universal Destinations & Experiences.

In the 1970s and 1980s, Taft Broadcasting created a division called KECO Entertainment (King's Entertainment Company), which was formed in order to build theme parks nationwide.  In 1972 and 1975, KECO built Kings Island and Kings Dominion respectively. In 1975, KECO led a forced purchase on the Carowinds Corporation, a bankrupt company, leaving them no choice but to sell Carowinds theme park in Charlotte, North Carolina. In 1981, KECO opened Canada's Wonderland in Vaughan, Ontario, Canada.

In 1984, hotel company Marriott, owner of two parks named Great America, was looking to divest itself of its parks. One of the parks was located in Silicon Valley in the exurbs of San Francisco and the other was located in the North Shore suburbs of Chicago. The California park was purchased by KECO, while the Illinois Park became part of the Six Flags chain.

In 1992, after 22 years of international operations, KECO Entertainment sold five of their parks to Paramount Communications (which was later purchased by Viacom). The remaining property, Australia’s Wonderland, wasn’t fully owned by Kings Entertainment and the minor stake they owned was sold to various Australian investor groups as the stake was not opted to be purchased by Paramount. Subsequently, in 1993, the "Paramount's" prefix was added to the parks, excluding Canada's Wonderland, which was renamed to "Paramount Canada's Wonderland", to avoid the use of a double possessive noun. Thus, the first five parks of the Paramount Parks were established: Paramount's Kings Island, Paramount's Kings Dominion, Paramount's Great America, Paramount's Carowinds, and Paramount Canada's Wonderland.

In 2000, Paramount Parks purchased the majority of shares in Spanish theme park Terra Mitica (Land of Myth), branding it Terra Mitica: A Paramount Park. In 2004, Viacom dropped its shares in the park, and the name was reverted without the Paramount suffix.

Theme 
Paramount Parks were one of the few remaining seasonal park operators to exclusively use themed layouts and rides (a practice usually observed only by annual park operators such as Universal Destinations & Experiences, Six Flags, SeaWorld Parks & Entertainment and Walt Disney Parks and Resorts). It's this aspect that likely helped the parks stand out against other regional competitors such as Cedar Fair (who later purchased the parks), who ran lightly themed amusement parks exclusively.

For example, while Cedar Fair's flagship park Cedar Point debuted Wicked Twister and Top Thrill Dragster in 2002 and 2003, respectively, Kings Island opened Tomb Raider: The Ride and Scooby-Doo and the Haunted Mansion. These two attractions, while costing only slightly less than Cedar Point's additions, were indoor, highly themed, immersive rides with synchronized musical scores and Hollywood special effects. The same can be said of Paramount's last additions to their parks, The Italian Job: Stunt Track, which are family-oriented roller coasters that also feature flames, water, synchronized music, and many movie props.

When Cedar Fair acquired the Paramount Parks, they revolutionized their own season pass system using Paramount's as a blueprint, and also absorbed some of Paramount's theme-focused entertainment, combining it with their own well-proven thrills to create some of their most famous attractions: Maverick at Cedar Point and Diamondback at Kings Island, among others.

Without the Paramount Pictures film licenses, many of the rides at the Paramount Parks were renamed to more generic names so as not to infringe on Paramount's copyrights. Many of these changes were "in name only," having no actual bearing on the ride's appearance. Because of the level of theme involved in Paramount's later rides, though, (such as The Italian Job: Stunt Track and Tomb Raider: The Ride) some rides did lose core elements, such as synchronized musical scores, special effects, and pre-shows (thereby eliminating story lines).

 Drop Zone: Stunt Tower was renamed Drop Tower at all five former Paramount parks.
 Top Gun was renamed Afterburn at Carowinds and Flight Deck at Canada's Wonderland and California's Great America. The ride at Kings Island was also first renamed Flight Deck from 2008-2013 then renamed The Bat (in honor of a previous suspended roller coaster at the park) in 2014.
 Face/Off at Kings Island was renamed Invertigo.
 The Italian Job: Stunt Track at Canada's Wonderland, Kings Dominion, and Kings Island were all renamed Backlot Stunt Coaster.
 Tomb Raider: The Ride and Tomb Raider: FireFall at Kings Island and Kings Dominion respectively were both renamed The Crypt. Both have since been removed as of 2020.
 The roller coaster at Canada's Wonderland was renamed Time Warp.
 Days of Thunder go-kart tracks were renamed Thunder Alley.
 Paramount Action-FX Theater was renamed Action Theater.
 The Paramount Theatre was renamed after each park it was located in (e.g. Kings Island Theatre).
 BORG Assimilator at Carowinds was renamed Nighthawk.
 Cliffhanger was renamed Riptide at Canada's Wonderland.
 Scooby Doo and the Haunted Mansion at Canada's Wonderland, Carowinds, Kings Dominion & Kings Island was renamed Boo Blasters on Boo Hill with the Scooby Doo theme removed.
 The Nickelodeon and Hanna-Barbera children's areas in all of the parks remained dormant until after the 2009 season, when they rethemed to Cedar Fair's Peanuts characters, under the name Planet Snoopy. In 2018, Carowinds rethemed their Planet Snoopy area to Camp Snoopy.
 There were two "Wayne's World" themed lands at Kings Dominion and Carowinds.
Perhaps the most notable change between park owners, Kings Island's $20 million indoor Tomb Raider: The Ride had its water effects, lasers, Hollywood lighting, pre-show, synchronized musical score, film props, artificial fog, and flame effects removed. Notably, The Crypt at Kings Dominion, similar to the ride at Kings Island with the exception that it was outdoors, retained all of its original theming, music, film props, lighting, fog, and flames.

Sale to Cedar Fair 
On January 27, 2006, the then-newly minted CBS Corporation announced its intent to sell Paramount Parks due to the fact that it did not fit well within the company's core business (producing and distributing television content). A number of groups expressed interest in purchasing the company, several placed bids, and on May 22, 2006, Cedar Fair announced it had outbid competitors and intended to purchase all five parks in the Paramount Parks chain, including Star Trek: The Experience at the Las Vegas Hilton and the management agreement of Bonfante Gardens. On June 30, 2006, Cedar Fair announced that it had completed its acquisition of Paramount Parks from CBS Corporation in a cash transaction valued at US$1.24 billion. Shortly following the transfer of ownership, Cedar Fair began the process of integrating the two companies. With the purchase of the Paramount Parks, Cedar Fair LP announced that it would do business under the name Cedar Fair Entertainment Company. Cedar Fair LP remains the legal company name.

Removal of references
The individual parks continued to operate under their Paramount names during the 2006 season. After 14 years of operation under Paramount, Cedar Fair began removing the Paramount name and logo from the parks in January 2007. The names of the main parks were changed back to their original pre-Paramount names (the Paramount's prefix was removed) with the Cedar Fair corporate logo added. Bonfante Gardens was changed to Gilroy Gardens. Cedar Fair began removing references to Paramount Pictures from all parks.

Although the acquisition granted Cedar Fair a ten-year licensing deal for Paramount names and icons, such as Star Trek and Tomb Raider, Cedar Fair opted to terminate the agreement and not pay an annual licensing fee for all properties besides Nickelodeon, which was terminated during 2009. The process of removing references to Paramount/CBS properties began in the parks during the beginning of the 2007 season and by the 2008 season most of the major references were completely removed from the parks, besides some minor remnants and logos occasionally found in the park.

Europe
On October 10, 2011, it was reported that Paramount would develop a theme park in Murcia, Spain with work set to start in 2012. The $1.5 billion Paramount Murcia park was hoped to rival Disneyland Paris as a European tourist destination. The resort would have featured 30 attractions with an adjacent shopping center, hotels and casino.

Following further set backs such as the death of the promoting companies CEO (Jesus Samper) and a High Court ruling, the construction of this park did not continue, and the area was instead expected to be reclassified for agricultural purposes.

London Resort

In the summer of 2017, a deal between Paramount and developer London Resort Company Holdings to build a resort collapsed, partly for the latter's wish to work with other media and broadcasting companies alongside Paramount. In June 2019, they relaunched the project, named London Resort and scheduled to open in 2024.

Proposed properties 
Paramount Murcia (Murcia, Spain).
Paramount Movie Park Korea

Former properties

Amusement parks 
Paramount Canada's Wonderland (Vaughan, Ontario) (renamed Canada's Wonderland)
Paramount's Carowinds (Charlotte, North Carolina) (renamed Carowinds)
Paramount's Great America (Santa Clara, California) (renamed California's Great America)
Paramount's Kings Dominion (Doswell, Virginia) (renamed Kings Dominion)
Paramount's Kings Island  (Mason, Ohio) (renamed Kings Island)
Bonfante Gardens  (Gilroy, California); (renamed Gilroy Gardens)
Terra Mítica, a Paramount Park: Benidorm, Valencian Community, Spain.

Water parks 
Boomerang Bay (California's Great America, Carowinds, Kings Island)
Splash Works (Canada's Wonderland)
WaterWorks (Kings Dominion)
Raging Waters (San Jose, California); bought by Ogden Corporation in 1999

Star Trek experience 
Star Trek: The Experience (Las Vegas, Nevada) (closed)

References

External links 
 
 
 

Paramount Pictures
Cedar Fair
Former Viacom subsidiaries
Former CBS Corporation subsidiaries
Entertainment companies established in 1992
Companies disestablished in 2006
Amusement park companies